

Medalists

Qualification

Qualification rule: qualification standard 20.20m or at least best 8 qualified

Final

External links
 Qualification
 Final

References

Shot put at the World Athletics Indoor Championships
Shot Put Men